Armando Bandini (born Armando Burlando; 5 June 1926 – 27 May 2011) was an Italian film, television and voice actor.

Biography
Born in Genoa, Bandini began his career as an actor after the war at the Teatro Sperimentale Luigi Pirandello. In the 1950s he moved to Rome, where he was protagonist of the revue Il dente senza giudizio and started working in films and on television. Bandini even worked as a voice dubber. He performed the Italian voices of some major Hollywood stars in at least one of two of their films. Among his most prominent dubbing roles, he was the Italian voice of Chi-Fu in the 1998 animated film Mulan.

Personal life
In the late 1940s, Bandini married stage actress Emma Fedeli and they were together until her death in 1980. He then married actress Daniela Igliozzi.

Death
Bandini died in Rome on 27 May 2011, just a week and a half before his 85th birthday. He was survived by his wife Daniela Igliozzi.

Filmography

Cinema

Tipi da spiaggia (1959) — Prince Joakim's Assistant
Love and Larceny (1960) — Il ragioniere 
Tu che ne dici? (1960) — Gangster 'Tritolo Joe' 
Bellezze sulla spiaggia (1961) — Ciccio
Don Camillo: Monsignor (1961) — Don Carlino 
His Women (1961) — Bandini 
The Success (1961) — Romanelli (uncredited)
La pupa (1963)
Latin Lovers (1965)
The Mandrake (1965) — Il servo de Ligurio 
Maigret a Pigalle (1966) — Il portiere del Picrate 
Ace High (1968) — Bank Cashier 
Togli le gambe dal parabrezza (1969)
The Eroticist (1972) — Bartolino, Maravidi's Secretary 
Giovannona Long-Thigh (1973) — Gay Train Passenger 
La signora è stata violentata (1973) — Lama 
The Sex Machine (1975) — Antique Dealer 
Son tornate a fiorire le rose (1975) — Commissario 
Pure as a Lily (1976) — Sandro Scibetta 
Per amore di Cesarina (1976) — L'impiegato del Grand Hotel 
Ride bene... chi ride ultimo (1977) — Armandino (segment "La visita di controllo")
Ridendo e scherzando (1978) — Il commissario 
Fontamara (1980)
A Proper Scandal (1984) — Orlando Gastaldelli 
Here's My Brother (1985) — Il preside
Una casa in bilico (1987) — Tonino, portiere 
A Violent Life (1990) — Treasurer

Dubbing roles

Animation
Chi-Fu in Mulan
Doctor Mouse in The Rescuers Down Under
Barney Rubble in The New Fred and Barney Show
Mr. Piccolo in Porco Rosso

Live action
Otis in Superman
Frank McCallister in Home Alone
Frank McCallister in Home Alone 2: Lost in New York

References

External links

Official Website

1926 births
2011 deaths
Actors from Genoa
Italian male film actors
Italian male stage actors
Italian male television actors
Italian male voice actors
20th-century Italian male actors